The 1971 Men's World Weightlifting Championships were held in Lima, Peru from September 18 to September 26, 1971. There were 144 men from 30 nations in the competition.

Medal summary

Medal table
Ranking by Big (Total result) medals 

Ranking by all medals: Big (Total result) and Small (Press, Snatch and Clean & Jerk)

References
Results (Sport 123)
Weightlifting World Championships Seniors Statistics

External links
International Weightlifting Federation

World Weightlifting Championships
World Weightlifting Championships
World Weightlifting Championships
International weightlifting competitions hosted by Peru